Albert Atkins (26 March 1867 – 17 August 1943) was an Australian cricketer. He played twelve first-class matches for New South Wales and Queensland between 1895/96 and 1905/06.

Atkins was a middle-order batsman and excellent fieldsman in the outfield, praised in 1896 for his "brilliancy and cat-like dash". He captained Queensland on several occasions, including the closely fought match against New South Wales in Sydney in 1902-03 when he made his two highest scores, 82 and 60. He and his wife Emily had three children.

See also
 List of New South Wales representative cricketers

References

External links
 

1867 births
1943 deaths
Australian cricketers
New South Wales cricketers
Queensland cricketers
Cricketers from Sydney